Emmanuel Ampeah (born 22 April 1968) is a retired Ghanaian football defender. He was a squad member at the 1992 and 1994 Africa Cup of Nations, including the 1992 Africa Cup of Nations Final, scoring his penalty in the lengthy penalty shootout.

References

1968 births
Living people
Ghanaian footballers
Ghana international footballers
1992 African Cup of Nations players
1994 African Cup of Nations players
Asante Kotoko S.C. players
King Faisal Babes FC players
Berekum Arsenal players
Association football defenders